Ilhéu de Santa Maria (once known as Quail Island) is a small uninhabited islet of the Sotavento archipelago in Cape Verde located off the shore of the island Santiago. Like all Cape Verdean islands, the islet is of volcanic origin. It is situated at the entrance of Praia Harbour, in front of Praia da Gamboa, near the city centre of Praia.

In the 1850s, a customs house and warehouses were built on the islet. The buildings have been used for quarantine as well, but this was moved to the new Lazareto on Ponta Temerosa in the 1870s.

In 2015, the Cape Verdean government and the Chinese-based Legend Development Company agreed on construction of a hotel resort and casino on the islet. As of May 2018, the bridge from the islet to the mainland has been completed, and construction of the hotel and casino are due to start in August 2018.

Notes

Uninhabited islands of Cape Verde
Subdivisions of Praia